Klichy  (Klykhy) is a village in the administrative district of Gmina Brańsk, within Bielsk County, Podlaskie Voivodeship, in north-eastern Poland.

According to the 1921 census, the village was inhabited by 316 people, among whom 303 were Roman Catholic, 9 were Orthodox, and 4 were Mosaic. At the same time, 315 inhabitants declared Polish nationality, and 1 declared Belarusian nationality. There were 56 residential buildings in the village.

References

Klichy